Cleonymia opposita is a moth of the family Noctuidae first described by Julius Lederer in 1870. It is widespread in Asia Minor, expanding northwards to the Armenian-Caucasian Region, eastward to Iraq.

Adults are on wing from March to April. There is one generation per year.

External links

Cuculliinae
Moths described in 1870
Moths of Europe
Moths of Asia
Moths of the Middle East